Christian Sorto (born January 19, 2000) is a professional footballer player who plays for The Miami FC in the USL Championship. Born in the United States, he represents the El Salvador national team.

Career
On June 26, 2019, Sorto joined D.C. United's USL Championship side Loudoun United.

On March 19, 2021, Sorto joined Rio Grande Valley FC ahead of the 2021 season. He left the team following the end of the season.

Sorto signed with USL Championship side Miami FC on December 28, 2021.

International
Born in the United States, Sorto is of Salvadoran descent. He represented the El Salvador national team in a friendly 2–0 loss to Guatemala on 24 September 2021. On January 24, 2021, Sorto was called up by the El Salvador national under-23 football team to participate in their camp ahead of the U23 Olympics qualifiers.

References

External links

2000 births
Living people
People from Silver Spring, Maryland
Salvadoran footballers
El Salvador international footballers
American soccer players
American sportspeople of Salvadoran descent
Association football forwards
Loudoun United FC players
Rio Grande Valley FC Toros players
Miami FC players
Soccer players from Maryland
USL Championship players